Midway is an unincorporated community in Moro Township, Madison County, Illinois, United States.

References

Unincorporated communities in Madison County, Illinois
Unincorporated communities in Illinois